The Russia-China Investment Fund (RCIF) is a bilateral cooperation fund created by the Russian Direct Investment Fund and the China Investment Corporation to invest in opportunities linking Russia, the Commonwealth of Independent States, and China.

Fundraising
RCIF was established in 2012. The initial seed capital of US$2 billion was funded in equal part by the China Investment Corporation, the sovereign wealth fund of China, and the Russian Direct Investment Fund, the sovereign wealth fund of Russia. In October 2018, the RCIF became trilateral with Public Investment Fund, the sovereign wealth fund of Saudi Arabia, contributing US$500 million to the RCIF, raising total capital to US$2.5 billion. The fund continues to seek contributions from new investors.

Investments
The RCIF was founded to pursue investment opportunities in Russia, members of the Commonwealth of Independent States, and investments in China with a close connection to Russia including China–Russia border infrastructure projects and Chinese firms trading with Russia in technology and services.

Other funds
Other China-Russia funds have been funded or implemented with the contribution of the RCIF. 

In 2017, China Development Bank, a Chinese policy bank and the Russian Direct Investment Fund announced plans to establish a China-Russia RMB Investment Cooperation Fund. RDIF chose to implement its part of the joint fund through RCIF while CDB used its subsidiary China Development Bank Capital for implementation. The goal behind the fund was to make investments of 68 billion yuan in Russian and Chinese projects including the Belt and Road Initiative and to help simplify investments in the Chinese and Russian currencies in the other country. In 2018, during Russian President Vladimir Putin's visit to Beijing, Russia-China Investment Fund (RCIF) and China Chengtong Holdings Group announced agreement to establish a US$1 billion "industrial investment fund".

References

Belt and Road Initiative
Private equity firms of China